Lou Carcolh, or the Carcolh, is a mythical beast from French folklore. It's described as a large, slimy, snail-like serpent with hairy tentacles and a large shell. It is said to live in a cavern beneath Hastingues, a town in the Les Landes region in southwestern France.

The carcolh's slime could sometimes be seen long before the creature itself arrived. Nobody dared to approach the creature, as unwary persons would be grabbed by its tentacles, dragged into its cave and devoured whole.

The Carcolh is a nickname given to the city of Hastingues, in the French department of Landes, due to its situation on a rounded-shape hill. Furthermore, the men of Hastingues used to say, as a pleasant warning to young and pretty women, "the carcolh will catch you!".

References

Sources

French legendary creatures
French folklore
Legendary invertebrates
Legendary serpents
Dragons
European dragons
Mythological molluscs